Filippo Porcari (born 28 April 1984) is an Italian footballer who plays as a midfielder for Crema in Serie D.

Porcari has played over 100 matches at the Italian third highest level. He followed Novara promoted from the third division to the first in 2 successive season.

Career
Born in Fidenza, the Province of Parma, Porcari started his career at hometown club Parma. He played his first match on 18 May 2003.

Milan
In June 2003, he was included in a multi-player transfer including Marco Donadel (€2 million), Davide Favaro (€1 million) and Mirko Stefani  (€1 million) of Milan and Luca Ferretti (€1 million), Roberto Massaro (€2 million) and Porcari (€1 million) of Parma, all in co-ownership deal. In June 2004 Milan purchased Donadel (€800,00), Ferretti (€1,000) and Porcari (€1,000) outright, with Favaro (€1,000) and Stefani (€1,000) moved to Parma outright.
Porcari spent 5 seasons on loan from 2003 to 2008.

Novara
Porcari was signed by Novara Calcio in summer 2008.

On 13 July 2011 he signed a new 3-year contract with Novara.

Spezia
On 4 July 2012 Porcari was signed by Spezia Calcio in a 2-year contract for €800,000 transfer fee. Novara signed Daniele Buzzegoli from Speiza in exchange, also for the same fee.

Carpi, Bari and Cremonese
On 2 September 2013 Porcari was transferred to Carpi on a  free transfer in a 2-year contract. On 28 August 2015 Porcari was signed by Bari in a 2-year contract. In January 2016 he returned to the Carpi where it ends the season. In the summer he moved to Cremonese.

Crema
On 17 July 2019, he signed with Crema.

Honours
 Lega Pro Prima Divisione: 2010 (Novara)

References

External links
 Profile at Novara 
 Profile at Football.it 
 Profile at FIGC 

1984 births
Living people
People from Fidenza
Italian footballers
Italy youth international footballers
Parma Calcio 1913 players
Calcio Padova players
Pisa S.C. players
Novara F.C. players
U.S. Avellino 1912 players
A.C. Carpi players
S.S.C. Bari players
U.S. Cremonese players
U.S. Triestina Calcio 1918 players
Piacenza Calcio 1919 players
Serie A players
Serie B players
Serie C players
Association football midfielders
Sportspeople from the Province of Parma
Footballers from Emilia-Romagna